Novavax, Inc. is an American biotechnology company based in Gaithersburg, Maryland that develops vaccines to counter serious infectious diseases. Prior to 2020, company scientists developed experimental vaccines for influenza and respiratory syncytial virus (RSV), as well as Ebola and other emerging infectious diseases. During 2020, the company redirected its efforts to focus on development and approval of its NVX-CoV2373 vaccine for COVID-19.

Their vaccine, Nuvaxovid, was approved in the European Union at the end of 2021 and in Canada in February 2022, as the fifth vaccine against COVID-19, following Pfizer/BioNTech, Moderna, Janssen and AstraZeneca.

History 
In June 2013, Novavax acquired the Matrix-M adjuvant platform with the purchase of Swedish company Isconova AB and renamed its new subsidiary Novavax AB.

ResVax 

In March 2015, the company completed a Phase I trial for its Ebola vaccine candidate, as well as a phase II study in adults for its RSV vaccine, which would become ResVax. The ResVax trial was encouraging as it showed significant efficacy against RSV infection, using a nanoparticle-based treatment using a recombinant F lipoprotein or saponin, "extracted from the Quillaja saponaria [or?] Molina bark together with cholesterol and phospholipid." It is aimed at stimulating resistance to respiratory syncytial virus infection, targeting both adult and infant populations.

2016 saw the company's first phase III trial, the 12,000 adult Resolve trial, for its respiratory syncytial virus vaccine, which would come to be known as ResVax, fail in September. This triggered an eighty-five percent dive in the company's stock price. Phase II adult trial results also released in 2016 showed a stimulation of antigenicity, but failure in efficacy. Evaluation of these results suggested that an alternative dosing strategy might lead to success, leading to plans to run new phase II trials. The company's difficulties in 2016 led to a three part strategy for 2017: cost reduction through restructuring and the termination of 30% of their workforce; pouring more effort into getting ResVax to market; and beginning clinical trials on a Zika virus vaccine.

Alongside the adult studies of ResVax, the vaccine was also in 2016 being tested against infant RSV infection through the route of maternal immunization.

In 2019, late-stage clinical testing of ResVax, failed for a second time, which resulted in a major downturn in investor confidence and a seventy percent reduction in capital value for the firm. As a secondary result, the company was forced to conduct a reverse stock split in order to maintain Nasdaq minimum qualification, meaning it was in risk of being delisted.

NanoFlu 

NanoFlu is a quadrivalent influenza vaccine, which completed Phase II clinical trials successfully in 2019. In January 2020, it was granted fast track designation by the U.S. Food and Drug Administration (FDA) to move into Phase III trials, which completed in March 2020.

Finance and external sponsorships

Novavax is financed by both public and private investors, of which approximately 50% of the free float shares are held by institutional investors.

Novavax is funded by a mix of private and public investment. In 2015, Novavax received a US$89 million research grant from the Bill and Melinda Gates Foundation to support the development of a vaccine against human respiratory syncytial virus for infants via maternal immunization.

In May 2020, Novavax received  from the Coalition for Epidemic Preparedness Innovations to fund early-stage evaluation in healthy adults of the company's COVID-19 vaccine candidate NVX-CoV2373 and to develop resources in preparation for large-scale manufacturing, if the vaccine proves successful. CEPI had already invested $4 million in March.

On July 7, 2020, during the Donald Trump administration, the company was awarded a  loan from the United States government from Operation Warp Speed program to cover the testing, commercialization and production of a potential coronavirus vaccine in the United States, with a goal of delivering 100 million doses by January 2021.

COVID-19 vaccine

Vaccine research and development 
In January 2020, Novavax announced development of a vaccine candidate, named NVX-CoV2373, to establish immunity to SARS-CoV-2. NVX-CoV2373 is a protein subunit vaccine that contains the spike protein of the SARS-CoV-2 virus. Novavax's work is in competition for vaccine development among dozens of other companies.

In January 2021, the company released phase III trials showing that it has 89% efficacy against Covid-19, and also provides strong immunity against new variants. It has applied for emergency use in the US and UK but will be distributed in the UK first. , the company does not anticipate that it will file for approval in the UK "until July at the earliest". On 14 June 2021, Novavax announced overall 90.4% efficacy in Phase 3 U.S & Mexico trial. Of the total 77 COVID-19 cases among the volunteer of the trial, 14 occurred in the vaccine group, while 63 occurred in the placebo group.

On May 22, 2021, Novavax and Moderna announced a deal with the South Korean government to manufacture their COVID-19 vaccines. The vaccine is also being co-developed (with the Coalition for Epidemic Preparedness Innovations) in India under the brand name Covovax.

On September 6, 2021, Novavax and Takeda Pharmaceutical Company announced that the Government of Japan's Ministry of Health, Labour and Welfare will purchase 150 million doses of Novavax's vaccine candidate TAK-019 pending regulatory approval. The Government of Japan's Ministry of Health, Labour and Welfare signed an agreement with Takeda Pharmaceutical Company for Takeda to manufacture and distribute Novavax's TAK-019 upon regulatory approval.

On December 22, 2021, Novavax confirmed the efficacy of two doses of vaccine against the omicron variant of SARS-CoV-2. The new data suggest that the vaccine provides an immune response against the Omicron variant and other variants of the coronavirus. The response of antibodies against omicron is four times lower than the original variant. A third dose of the vaccine given to adults, six months after the first two doses, increased the level of neutralizing antibodies against the omicron variant by 73.5 times, making it more effective in preventing omicron from entering human cells.

The data shows that the 73.5-fold increase in antibody level following a third dose of Novavax vaccine (protein subunit vaccine) was higher than the booster doses of Pfizer and Moderna (mRNA vaccines), which increased the antibody levels 25-fold and 37-fold, respectively.

Authorization and application 
On November 1, 2021, Novavax and Serum Institute of India announced that the National Agency of Drug and Food Control of Indonesia, or Badan Peng was Obat dan Makanan (Badan POM), has granted emergency use authorization (EUA) for Novavax' recombinant nanoparticle protein-based COVID-19 vaccine with Matrix-M adjuvant. It will be manufactured by SII in India and marketed by SII in Indonesia under the brand name Covovax.

On December 17, 2021, the World Health Organization (WHO) added Novavax's Covovax vaccine, jointly developed with the Serum Institute of India (SII), to the list of approved coronavirus vaccines for emergency use. The vaccine can then be used in the Covax programme for the supply of vaccines to low and middle income countries. Novavax and SII provide Covax program with 1.1 billion doses of vaccine.

On 20 December 2021, the European Medicines Agency recommended Novavax's Nuvaxovid vaccine for conditional marketing authorisation, which was formally approved by the European Commission, making it the fifth approved COVID-19 vaccine in the European Union after Pfizer/BioNTech, Moderna, Janssen and AstraZeneca.

On 20 January 2022, The Therapeutic Goods Administration (TGA) has granted provisional approval to Biocelect Pty Ltd (on behalf of Novavax Inc) for its COVID-19 vaccine, NUVAXOVID. This is the first protein COVID-19 vaccine to receive regulatory approval in Australia.

On 31 January 2022, Novavax applied to the Federal Drug Administration (FDA) for emergency use authorization (EUA) for NVX-CoV2373, and on June 7, FDA's panel of outside advisors recommended FDA grant the EUA.

In February 2022, Health Canada authorized Nuvaxovid for the prevention of COVID-19 in adults 18 years of age and older.

On 13 July 2022, the U.S. Food and Drug Administration issued an emergency use authorization (EUA) for the Novavax COVID-19 Vaccine, Adjuvanted for the prevention of COVID-19 caused by severe acute respiratory syndrome coronavirus 2 (SARS-CoV-2) in individuals 18 years of age and older.

Vaccine adjuvants
Novavax also develops proprietary immune-stimulating saponin-based immunologic adjuvants at a wholly-owned Swedish subsidiary, Novavax AB. One of these, Matrix-M, is used in Novavax's approved vaccine for COVID-19 (NVX-CoV2373).

References

External links
 

Pharmaceutical companies of the United States
American companies established in 1987
Pharmaceutical companies established in 1987
Companies based in Gaithersburg, Maryland
Health care companies based in Maryland
Companies listed on the Nasdaq
Vaccine producers
COVID-19 vaccine producers